Coleophora striolatella is a moth of the family Coleophoridae. It is found from southern France to Italy and from Hungary to Spain.

The larvae feed on Linum narbonense. They create a slender tubular silken case with a moth angle of about 10°. Full-grown cases are found in April and May.

References

striolatella
Moths of Europe
Moths described in 1849